

Wilhelm Antrup (1 February 1910 – 14 November 1984) was a German air general. 

During the Nazi era, he served in the Luftwaffe and was a recipient of the Knight's Cross of the Iron Cross with Oak Leaves. In 1956, joined the post war German Air Force of the newly-founded Bundeswehr. In 1964, he became commander of the Höhere Technische Schule der Luftwaffe (Higher Technical School of the Luftwaffe), which was reorganized to the Technische Akademie der Luftwaffe (Technical Academy of the Luftwaffe) on 1 June 1966. His rank was Brigadegeneral. Antrup was retired in March 1968.

Awards and decorations

 German Cross in Gold (2 January 1942)
 Knight's Cross of the Iron Cross with Oak Leaves
 Knight's Cross on 13 November 1942 as Hauptmann and Staffelkapitän of the 5./Kampfgeschwader 55
 655th Oak Leaves on 18 November 1944 as Oberstleutnant and Geschwaderkommodore of Kampfgeschwader 55

References

Citations

Bibliography

 
 

1910 births
1984 deaths
Bundeswehr generals
Condor Legion personnel
Luftwaffe pilots
Recipients of the Knight's Cross of the Iron Cross with Oak Leaves
Brigadier generals of the German Air Force
People from Tecklenburg
Military personnel from North Rhine-Westphalia
Recipients of the Gold German Cross